Frankenhausen is a German-language place name that may refer to the following:

Bad Frankenhausen, Thuringia
Battle of Frankenhausen
Frankenhausen in Crimmitschau, Free State of Saxony
Frankenhausen Abbey
Frankenhausen in Mühltal, Hesse
Frankenhausen in Grebenstein, Hesse

See also
Frankhauser